Mikhail Valeryevich Salnikov (born 17 December 1974) is a Russian football coach and a former player.

External links
 

1974 births
Sportspeople from Chelyabinsk
Living people
Soviet footballers
Russian footballers
FC Lada-Tolyatti players
FC Metallurg Lipetsk players
Russian football managers
Association football defenders
FC Energiya Volzhsky players
FC Nosta Novotroitsk players
FC Spartak Nizhny Novgorod players